The Pengkalan Balak Beach is a beach in Alor Gajah District, Malacca, Malaysia which features turtle sculptures.

See also
 Geography of Malaysia
 List of tourist attractions in Malacca

References

Beaches of Melaka